Collision Course is a science fiction novel by American  author Robert Silverberg, first published in hardcover in 1961 by Avalon Books and reprinted in paperback as an Ace Double later that year. Ace reissued it as a stand-alone volume in 1977 and 1982; a Tor paperback appeared in 1988. An Italian translation was also published in 1961, and a German translation later appeared. Silverberg planned the novel as a serial for Astounding Science Fiction, but John W. Campbell rejected the work and Silverberg eventually sold a shorter version to Amazing Stories, where it appeared in 1959.

Collision Course details the response of the political leadership of Earth to an eventual collision of their aggressive expanding colonial empire with a newly discovered alien race.

Plot

The story is set in approximately the 26th century, after nearly five centuries of expansion into space limited by the speed of light, as ships with intrepid crews travel to new solar systems and install instantaneous transportation terminals known as transmats, which tie in with a system based on Earth.  The current ruler, who leads a small group of men chosen and trained as leaders, is dissatisfied with the light barrier and upon becoming the leader—the technarch—he made a public address calling on science to find a way to exceed that barrier.

The first crewed FTL (faster-than-light) ship has reported in from its test flight, and upon landing, report their successful voyage through an alternate universe to distant locations in the galaxy, and of discovering the outer reaches of an alien civilization.  The technarch convenes a meeting of the ruling group, receive a report from the star crew, then deliberate the technarch's intention to negotiate a division of the galaxy between them.  He selects four men to accompany the five star crew back out, although the crew are exhausted and not enthusiastic about another long trip.

The four men selected to go on the trip find they are very different in temperament and outlook, and tempers flare between two of them.  They endure the long voyage that is unlike an instant transmat trip, and upon arrival, the crew meet the aliens.  The linguist chosen by the technarch proceeds to teach the aliens English, then explain the situation about the expanding empires.  The aliens say they cannot speak for their people and walk out, summoning more senior officials.  The officials seem agreeable there should be no war, but impose not a division between the two peoples, rather, they tell Earth it can no longer expand, then they walk out.

The FTL ship crew agree to return home with the bad news, which they believe will lead to war, but they get lost in the alternate space and return to normal space in the Large Magellanic Cloud.  The captain believes they should simply concede and find a place to live, even as the Milky Way tantalizes them in the sky of the planet they are borne to by a mysterious alien.

The Magellanic aliens summon the officials from Earth's opponents, and force an equal division of the Milky Way, then return the Milky Way citizens to where they were—the FTL ship right back to where it was before its faulty attempt to return home.  This time, the flight home proceeds correctly and they arrive to inform the technarch of the Magellanic aliens' enforcement that would prevent the technarch's dreams of human settlement in other galaxies.

Reception
Rating it three stars out of five, Galaxy reviewer Floyd C. Gale described the novel as "entertaining and deft", if glibly plotted, noting that it "benefits from [Silverberg's] sure control of pace".

References

1958 American novels
American science fiction novels
Large Magellanic Cloud in fiction
Novels by Robert Silverberg
Novels set in the 26th century
Avalon Books books